The Marcos administration, Marcos Administration, Marcos presidency, Marcos Presidency or Marcos leadership may refer to the following:
 Presidency of Ferdinand Marcos Sr., (1965-1986)
 First term of the presidency of Ferdinand Marcos, (1965-1969)
 Second term of the presidency of Ferdinand Marcos, (1969-1972)
 Martial law under Ferdinand Marcos, (1972-1986)
 Presidency of Bongbong Marcos Jr., (2022-2028)

See also 

 People Power Revolution
 Ferdinand Marcos's cult of personality
 Marcos family